Suweid Hamira is a Bedouin village in northern Israel. Located near Shefa-'Amr, it falls under the jurisdiction of Jezreel Valley Regional Council.

The village was recognised by the state in 1996.

See also
Arab localities in Israel
Bedouin in Israel

References

Arab villages in Israel
Populated places in Northern District (Israel)